Limerick East was a parliamentary constituency represented in Dáil Éireann, the lower house of the Irish parliament or Oireachtas from 1948 to 2011. The method of election was proportional representation by means of the single transferable vote (PR-STV).

History and boundaries 
The constituency was created under the Electoral (Amendment) Act 1947 and first used at the 1948 general election. It succeeded the constituency of Limerick, which was divided between Limerick East and Limerick West.

At its abolition, it encompassed the whole of Limerick City, together with the Castleconnell electoral area and part of the Bruff electoral area of County Limerick and the Ballyglass electoral division in County Clare.

The constituency elected 4 deputies (Teachtaí Dála, commonly known as TDs) from 1948 to 1981, and 5 deputies from 1981 to 2011.

While support for left-wing parties has usually been strong in the city of Limerick, the constituency also elected at least one Progressive Democrats TD in all general elections from 1987 until 2007.

The Constituency Commission published its final recommendations on 23 October 2007. As a result of population decline, Limerick East was replaced by a 4-seat Limerick City constituency at the 2011 general election. Most of the rural parts of Limerick East were transferred to the new Limerick constituency.

TDs

Elections

2007 general election

2002 general election

1998 by-election 
Following the death of Labour Party TD Jim Kemmy, a by-election was held on 11 March 1998. The seat was won by the Labour Party candidate Jan O'Sullivan.

1997 general election

1992 general election

1989 general election

1987 general election

November 1982 general election

February 1982 general election

1981 general election

1977 general election

1973 general election

1969 general election

1968 by-election 
Following the death of Fianna Fáil TD Donogh O'Malley, a by-election was held on 22 May 1968. The seat was won by the Fianna Fáil candidate Desmond O'Malley, nephew of the deceased TD.

1965 general election

1961 general election

1957 general election

1954 general election

1952 by-election 
Following the death of Fianna Fáil TD Daniel Bourke, a by-election was held on 26 June 1952. The seat was won by the Fine Gael candidate John Carew.

1951 general election

1948 general election

See also 
Dáil constituencies
Politics of the Republic of Ireland
List of political parties in the Republic of Ireland
List of Dáil by-elections
Elections in the Republic of Ireland

References

External links 
Oireachtas Members Database

Historic constituencies in County Limerick
Dáil constituencies in the Republic of Ireland (historic)
Politics of Limerick (city)
1948 establishments in Ireland
2011 disestablishments in Ireland
Constituencies established in 1948
Constituencies disestablished in 2011